Giejsz is a Polish coat of arms. It was used by several szlachta families.

History

Blazon

Gallery

See also
 Polish heraldry
 Heraldic family
 List of Polish nobility coats of arms

Bibliography 
 Juliusz Karol Ostrowski: Księga herbowa rodów polskich. T. 2. Warszawa: Główny skład księgarnia antykwarska B. Bolcewicza, 1897, s. 88.
 Kasper Niesiecki: Herbarz polski. T. 4. Lipsk: Breitkopf i Heartel, 1841, s. 116.
 Tadeusz Gajl: Herbarz polski od średniowiecza do XX wieku : ponad 4500 herbów szlacheckich 37 tysięcy nazwisk 55 tysięcy rodów. L&L, 2007, s. 406-539. .

Polish coats of arms